The Dark Element is the debut studio album by the Finnish heavy metal band of the same name. It was released on November 10, 2017, through Frontiers Records.

Track listing

Personnel
Credits for The Dark Element adapted from liner notes.

The Dark Element
 Anette Olzon – lead and backing vocals
 Jani Liimatainen – guitars, keyboards, programming, backing vocals
 Jonas Kuhlberg – bass
 Jani "Hurtsi" Hurula – drums

Additional musicians
 Jarkko Lahti – piano on tracks 5 and 10
 Niilo Sevänen – growls on track 6
 Anssi Stenberg – backing vocals
 Petri Aho – backing vocals

Production
 Nicke Olsson – engineering (vocals)
 Jonas Kuhlberg – engineering (bass)
 Ahti Kortelainen – engineering (drums)
 Sami Koivisto – engineering (piano)
 Jacob Hansen – mixing, mastering
 Serafino Perugino – executive producer
 Giulio Cataldo – layout

Chart positions

References

2017 debut albums
Frontiers Records albums
King Records (Japan) albums